Kommareddy Surender Reddy  (1941/1942 – 2 February 2020) was an Indian politician from Telangana belonging to Telugu Desam Party. He was a legislator of the Andhra Pradesh Legislative Assembly. He was a minister of the Government of Andhra Pradesh too.

Biography
Reddy was elected as a legislator of the  Andhra Pradesh Legislative Assembly from Medchal in 1985. Later, he was appointed as the Forest Minister of Government of Andhra Pradesh.

Reddy died on 2 February 2020.

References

1940s births
2020 deaths
Telugu Desam Party politicians
Andhra Pradesh MLAs 1985–1989
State cabinet ministers of Andhra Pradesh
Year of birth missing